Area health authorities were 90 bodies responsible for administering the National Health Service, established in England by the National Health Service Reorganisation Act 1973 in 1974. Each covered a geographical population which matched a Local Government territory.  They co-ordinated primary care services and services requiring collaboration with local government.  They were abolished in 1982 and their responsibilities transferred to the smaller district health authorities.

Membership of area health authorities:
Chairman - appointed by the Secretary of State
Fifteen members; sixteen in teaching areas.
Four members representative of local authorities
Others appointed by the regional health authority after consultation with universities associated with the region, bodies representative of the professions and any federation of workers' organisations.

See also
UK enterprise law
Health regions of Canada, which were generally established during the same era

References

Defunct National Health Service organisations